Alan Agustín Velasco (born 27 July 2002) is an Argentine professional footballer who plays as a winger for Major League Soccer club FC Dallas.

Club career
Velasco started his career in the youth system of Independiente, having joined the club in 2012. He was promoted into their first-team, aged sixteen, towards the end of the 2018–19 campaign, with the winger initially appearing as an unused substitute for a Copa Sudamericana second stage encounter with Rionegro Águilas on 21 May 2019. He was again on the bench for the second leg on 28 May, with Velasco subsequently making his professional debut at the Estadio Libertadores de América; replacing Jony in added time. Sixteen appearances later, Velasco scored his first senior goal in the Sudamericana away to Fénix in Montevideo.

Velasco, aged eighteen, netted his opening domestic goals in the Copa de la Liga Profesional in November and December against Colón and Argentinos Juniors respectively. That was followed by a strike against Arsenal de Sarandí on 3 January and a brace away to River Plate on 9 January.

On February 1, 2022, Velasco was announced by FC Dallas as its costliest signing ever in a four-year deal reported at $7 million with potentially an additional $1.7M based on incentives. Independiente will also receive 15% of his next sale.

International career
Velasco represented Argentina at U15 and U17 level, scoring one goal in four appearances for the latter at the 2019 South American Championship in Peru; which they won. In October 2019, Velasco was called up for the 2019 FIFA U-17 World Cup in Brazil.

Career statistics

Honours
Argentina U17
South American U-17 Championship: 2019

Notes

References

External links

2002 births
Living people
People from Quilmes
Argentine footballers
Argentina youth international footballers
Association football forwards
Argentine Primera División players
Club Atlético Independiente footballers
FC Dallas players
Designated Players (MLS)
Major League Soccer players
Sportspeople from Buenos Aires Province